Kudat Airport  is an airport serving the town of Kudat, Sabah, Malaysia.

Airlines and destinations

Accidents and Incidents

 MASwings Flight 3002

See also

 List of airports in Malaysia

References

External links

Short Take-Off and Landing Airports (STOL) at Malaysia Airports Holdings Berhad

Airports in Sabah
Kudat